Nirmala Sankhwar is an Indian politician and a member of 17th Legislative Assembly, Uttar Pradesh of India. She represents the ‘Rasulabad’ constituency in Kanpur Dehat district of Uttar Pradesh.

Political career
Nirmala Sankhwar contested Uttar Pradesh Assembly Election as Bharatiya Janata Party candidate and defeated her close contestant Arun Kumar Kori from Samajwadi Party with a margin of 33,394 votes.

Posts held

References

Uttar Pradesh MLAs 2017–2022
1969 births
Living people
Bharatiya Janata Party politicians from Uttar Pradesh